James Blake defeated Carlos Moyá 6–3, 5–7, 6–1 to win the 2007 Medibank International singles event.

Seeds

Draws

Key
 Q = Qualifier
 WC = Wild card
 r = Retired
w/o = Walkover
LL = Lucky loser
S = Special exempt

Finals

Section 1

Section 2

References

External links
Main Draw
Qualifying draw

Men's Singles
2007 ATP Tour